Schizosthetus is a genus of mites in the family Parasitidae.

Species
 Schizosthetus lyriformis (McGraw & Farrier, 1969)     
 Schizosthetus simulatrix Athias-Henriot, 1982     
 Schizosthetus vicarius Athias-Henriot, 1982

References

Parasitidae